Andesembiidae is a family of webspinners in the order Embioptera. There are at least two genera and about seven described species in Andesembiidae.

Genera
These two genera belong to the family Andesembiidae:
 Andesembia Ross, 2003
 Bryonembia Ross, 2003

References

Further reading

 
 
 
 

Embioptera
Insect families